Edward Michael Sandford (born August 20, 1928) is a Canadian former professional ice hockey forward. He played most of his professional career for the Boston Bruins of the National Hockey League.

Playing career
Sandford played his junior hockey for the St. Michael's Majors program, leading his team to the Memorial Cup playoffs in 1946 and 1947.  In 1947, Sandford led the Ontario Hockey Association with 67 points in 27 games, adding 52 points in nine OHA playoffs and ten Memorial Cup games en route to St. Michael's third Memorial Cup title.  For his efforts, he was awarded the Red Tilson Trophy as the OHA's most valuable player.

Sandford was signed by the Bruins in 1947.  Duringr the 1953 season he led all scorers in the playoffs with eight goals and eleven points and was named to play in the NHL All-Star Game in five consecutive seasons starting in 1951. His best scoring season was 1954, when he scored 16 goals and 31 assists for 47 points, finishing in the top ten in league scoring, and earning citation as a Second Team All-Star.  The next season, he was named to succeed the retiring Milt Schmidt as Bruins' captain.

He played eight seasons in all for the Bruins, but was traded in the 1955 offseason in a nine-player deal - the largest in NHL history to that date - which sent him to the Detroit Red Wings.  After playing four games in Detroit, the Wings dealt Sandford to the Chicago Black Hawks, where he finished out the season before retiring. Sandford finished his playing days with 106 goals and 145 assists for 251 points in 503 games, recording 355 penalty minutes.

Retirement
For many years after his retirement, Sandford served in various off-ice capacities for the Bruins, as a goal judge, official scorer and eventually supervisor of off-ice officials.  He became a curling enthusiast after his playing days  and was one of the players of the Bruins' first alumni team.  In 2001, the Society for International Hockey Research, in collaboration with the Hockey Hall of Fame and The Hockey News, selected a list of would-be Conn Smythe Trophy winners for the NHL playoff MVP before the trophy was officially presented in 1965, and determined on Sandford's selection for his efforts in the 1953 playoffs.

Career statistics

External links
 
 Sandford's profile on the Hockey Hall of Fame site

1928 births
Living people
Boston Bruins captains
Boston Bruins players
Canadian ice hockey forwards
Chicago Blackhawks players
Detroit Red Wings players
Ice hockey people from Toronto
Toronto St. Michael's Majors players